Hanging Garden, Hanging garden, or Hanging Gardens may refer to:

Horticulture and plants
Hanging garden (cultivation), a sustainable landscape architecture, an artistic garden or a small urban farm, attached to or built on a wall
 Hanging gardens plant community of the flora of the Colorado Plateau and Canyonlands region

Art, literature and music
The Hanging Garden (film), a 1997 film by Thom Fitzgerald
 Hanging Garden (film), a 2005 Japanese film
The Hanging Garden (Rankin novel), a 1998 novel by Ian Rankin
"The Hanging Garden", TV adaptation, an episode of Rebus
The Hanging Garden (White novel), a 2012 unfinished novel by Patrick White
"The Hanging Garden" (song), by The Cure (1982)
 Hanging Gardens (The Necks album), a 1999 album by The Necks
 Hanging Gardens (Classixx album), a 2013 album by Classixx
 Hanging Gardens, a 1990 live album by Nico

Places
 Hanging Gardens of Babylon, one of the Seven Wonders of the Ancient World
 Hanging Gardens of Mumbai, in India
 Terraces (Bahá'í), also known as the Hanging Gardens of Haifa, in Israel